Gary Bazil Brent (born 13 January 1976) is a former Zimbabwean cricketer.

Brent is an inswinging bowler, with a good slow-arm bowling technique. Having missed the cut for the 2003 Cricket World Cup, he made the squad for the 2003/04 tour in Australia. Brent was one of the fifteen "rebel" players who were dismissed in 2004 due to a dispute with the Zimbabwean Cricket Board.

Brent was a surprise call-up during the 2006 ICC Champions Trophy, replacing the injured Terrence Duffin. He played just the one match, but proved useful, taking 1/28 from seven overs, and adding ten with the bat as part of the Zimbabwean total of 130.

In the first ODI against South Africa, Brent equaled his top score with a defiant 59 after his team was reduced to 72–7. He won the man of the match award, after a good bowling performance as well.

Brent was also selected for the tour to Bangladesh, starting in late November 2007.

Having spent two seasons as a cricket professional at Rugby School in Warwickshire, Brent returned to his native Zimbabwe in September 2010 to take up a coaching job for one of the country's regional youth sides.

Brent is now coaching cricket at the York Cricket Academy in York. In March 2022, he was named head coach of the Zimbabwe women's team.

References

External links
 

1976 births
Living people
Sportspeople from Chinhoyi
White Zimbabwean sportspeople
Alumni of Eaglesvale High School
CFX Academy cricketers
Manicaland cricketers
Mashonaland cricketers
Zimbabwean cricketers
Commonwealth Games competitors for Zimbabwe
Cricketers at the 1998 Commonwealth Games
Zimbabwe Twenty20 International cricketers
Zimbabwe Test cricketers
Zimbabwe One Day International cricketers
Zimbabwean cricket coaches